Mozhgan Bayat (born July 20, 1979) is an Iranian film and television actress.

Biography 
She graduated in film directing from Soura University; And she started her cinematic activity in 2007 with the film For My Sister.

Filmography

References 
 Wikipedia Fa

External links 
 Mozhgan Bayat in Instagram
 

1979 births
Living people
People from Tehran
Actresses from Tehran
Iranian film actresses
Soore University alumni